Beth Ann Fennelly (born May 22, 1971) is an American poet and prose writer and was the Poet Laureate of Mississippi.



Biography
She was born in New Jersey and raised in Lake Forest, Illinois. She attended Woodlands Academy of the Sacred Heart in Lake Forest, graduating in 1989. She earned a B.A. magna cum laude from the University of Notre Dame in 1993. After graduation, she taught English for a year in a coal mining city on the Czech/Polish border. She later earned an MFA from the University of Arkansas, followed by the Diane Middlebrook Fellowship at the University of Wisconsin. She taught poetry at Knox College for two years. Since 2001, she's taught poetry and non-fiction at the University of Mississippi, where she has won several teaching awards, including Outstanding Liberal Arts Teacher of the Year (2011) and the University of Mississippi Humanities Teacher of the Year (2011).

Fennelly's first collection of poems, Open House, won multiple awards, including the Zoo Press Poetry Prize, the 2001 Kenyon Review Prize, the Great Lakes Colleges Association Award, and a Book Sense Top Ten Poetry Pick. Her poems have been included in numerous anthologies, including three editions of The Best American Poetry. She received a grant from the National Endowment of the Arts in 2002 and she has also won a Pushcart Prize. In 2009, she received a Fulbright grant to Brazil to study the poetry of Elizabeth Bishop. Her second and third books of poetry, Tender Hooks (2004) and Unmentionables (2008), were published by W. W. Norton.

Fennelly is a contributor to The Oxford American, where her essays frequently feature the topics of Southern food, music, and books. Her essays have appeared in Ploughshares, Poets & Writers, Ecotone, and The Virginia Quarterly Review. The Society of American Travel Writers awarded her the Lowell Prize for her work in Southern Living. She published a book of essays, Great With Child: Letters to a Young Mother, in 2006.
 
Fennelly and her husband, Tom Franklin, co-authored a novel, The Tilted World, set during the 1927 flood of the Mississippi River. Published in 2013 by HarperCollins, it was named an IndieNext Great Read and a finalist for the 2014 SIBA Book Award and published in six foreign editions.

More recently, Fennelly has been writing flash nonfiction pieces in such magazines as Creative Nonfiction, The Southern Review, Five Points, The Normal School, Guernica, and The Missouri Review. Her collection, Heating & Cooling: 52 Micro-Memoirs, was published by W. W. Norton in fall of 2017. The Atlanta Journal Constitution named it a “Best Southern Book of 2017” and it was awarded the 2018 Housatonic Book Award in Nonfiction.

In August 2016, Fennelly was named the new Poet Laureate of Mississippi. In 2020, she was named an Academy of American Poets Laureate Fellow.

She is married to novelist Tom Franklin and they have three children. They live in Oxford, Mississippi.

Selected works
 A Different Kind of Hunger (1997) Poems, Chapbook,  Winner of The Texas Review Breakthrough Prize.
 Open House Poems, Zoo Press (2002) reissued by W. W. Norton (2009)
 Tender Hooks Poems, W. W. Norton (2004)
 Great with Child: Letters to a Young Mother Nonfiction, W. W. Norton (2006)
 Unmentionables Poems, W. W. Norton (2008)
 The Tilted World Novel, co-authored with Tom Franklin (author) Harper Collins (2013)
 Foreign Editions: UK, France, Italy, Korea, Taiwan, Japan.
 Reviewed in: BookList (starred); Associated Press; Publishers Weekly; Library Journal; Kirkus; Garden & Gun; The Literary Review (UK); The Irish Times, The Financial Times (UK); The Guardian (UK); The Atlanta Journal-Constitution; The Jackson Clarion-Ledger; The Memphis Commercial Appeal; The Wilmington Star-News; Notre Dame Magazine; Memphis Magazine; Birmingham Magazine; Virginia Quarterly Review; Austin-American Statesman; LA Review of Books; The Chicago Examiner; The Seattle Times.
 Selected for: IndieNext Great Read for October 2013; Southern Booksellers Association Fall Okra Pick; October 2013 LibraryReads Pick; Featured Alternate Selection of The Literary Guild, Book-of the-Month Club, DoubleDay Book Club, Mystery Guild, Quality Paperback Book Club and Columbia House Book Club.  Named one of San Francisco Librarian's Best Books of 2013 and Uncut Magazine's Best Books of 2013. Nominated for MS Institute of Arts and Letters and the Dabwaha Award. Finalist for 2014 SIBA Award.
 Heating & Cooling: 52 Micro-Memoirs Nonfiction, W. W. Norton (2017)

Selected honors and awards

 Academy of American Poets Laureate Fellowship, 2020
The Univ. of Mississippi CLA Faculty Achievement Award (for “unusually significant and meritorious achievement in teaching, scholarship, and service”), 2018
The Lamar York Prize in Creative Nonfiction, The Chattahoochee Review, 2016
 Orlando Award in Nonfiction from A Room of Her Own, 2015
The University of Notre Dame Alumni Association's Griffin Award for Outstanding Accomplishments in Writing, 2015.
The Subiaco Award for Literary Merit, 2012.
Mississippi Arts Commission Grant, nonfiction, 2015, poetry, 2010, nonfiction, 2005
Fulbright Scholarship, Brazil, 2009
United States Artist Grant, 2006
The Black Warrior Review Poetry Contest, 2006
Sewanee Writers Conference Fellowship, 2004
National Endowment for the Arts Award, 2003
Breadloaf Writers Conference Fellowship, 2003
Pushcart Prize, 2001.
State of Illinois Arts Council Grant, 2001. 
MacDowell Colony Residency, Peterborough, NH, 2000.
The University of Arizona Poetry Center Summer Residency, 1999.

Links to work online

Essays
“What Good is Literature?  Reading and the Empathetic Brain”
“Refuge and Prospect: The Front Porch”
“Making Much of the Moment: a Guide to the Micro-Memoir”
"Everything But: Creating Tension in Love Poetry"
"Fruits We’ll Never Taste" 
"My Hundred"
"On Collaboration"
"On Poetry and the Reallocation of Concentration: Learning to Forget"

Poems
Eight Poems on Academy of American Poets Website
"Kudzu Chronicles" (Author's Audio with Text and Interpretive Video)
Micro-memoirs
Micro-memoirs
"Poem Not to Be Read at Your Wedding"
"Say You Waved: A Dream Song Cycle"
"The Welcoming"

Links to book reviews and interviews
Heating & Cooling The Kenyon Review
Heating & Cooling The Rumpus
Reading Women Interview
Open House Valparaiso Poetry Review
Tender Hooks Literary Mama 
Unmentionables Smartish Pace
Great With Child Publishers Weekly
The Tilted World The Guardian
Dueling Writers & Honing the Creative Impulse: A Conversation with Beth Ann Fennelly Prairie Schooner
Kind of Dancing: An Interview with Tom Franklin & Beth Ann Fennelly Fiction Writers Review

References

External links
 BethAnnFennelly.com - Official Website

American essayists
People from New Jersey
1971 births
Living people
University of Notre Dame alumni
University of Arkansas alumni
University of Mississippi faculty
American women poets
American women essayists
21st-century American poets
American women academics
21st-century American women writers